David Henry Wray (born 20 June 1959), who performs as Frank Bennett (the stage name is a combination of Frank Sinatra and Tony Bennett), is an Australian jazz singer, musician and songwriter. His vocal style is influenced by those two singers and the music of the 1940s and 1950s. He has provided big band cover versions of rock and pop singles, "Creep" (originally by Radiohead), "Better Man" (Pearl Jam), and "Under the Bridge" (Red Hot Chili Peppers). His version of "Creep" was listed in the Triple J Hottest 100, 1996. He has received nominations at the ARIA Music Awards.

Biography 

Frank Bennett was born as David Wray in 1959 and grew up in the Sydney suburb of Birrong (from an Aboriginal word for star) where he attended Birrong Primary and Birrong Boys High School. He played drums in his early teens. After leaving school in 1975 he found work as a store man and labourer. He started learning saxophone in 1977 and within a year began playing in various bands on the Sydney pub and club circuit from the late 1970s through to the early 1990s: the Layabouts, the Eddys, the Zarzoff Brothers, the Foreday Riders, the Allniters, Club Ska, Paris Green and Bellydance. He began singing professionally several years later as Tony Sinatra.

In 1996 he was offered a recording contract with Polygram/Universal Music and, after changing his stage name to Frank Bennett, he recorded Five O'clock Shadow, an album of lounge music cover versions of contemporary popular songs. Two years later, he released a second album, Cash Landing, via EMI Records with the themes of money and avarice. It received a nomination at ARIA Music Awards of 1999 for Best Adult Contemporary Album. In 1998 he opened for Tom Jones at Sydney's Star City and Burt Bacharach on Bacharach's Australian tour. He appears as in the 2000 Australian film The Dish as Barry Steele, a singer who sounds "a little like Frank Sinatra". He has performed on saxophone with Daddy Cool and Glenn Shorrock (ex-the Little River Band).

In 2002 Bennett was a member of Jim Conway's Big Wheel, led by harmonica player, Jim Conway. They released an album, Little Story (September 2003), which received an ARIA nomination for Best Blues and Roots Album in 2004. It was voted best Australian Blues release for 2003 by the readers of Rhythms Magazine.

Discography

Studio albums

Singles

Awards and nominations

ARIA Music Awards
The ARIA Music Awards is an annual awards ceremony that recognises excellence, innovation, and achievement across all genres of Australian music. They commenced in 1987.

! 
|-
|rowspan="2"| 1997
| Five O'Clock Shadow
| ARIA Award for Best New Talent
| 
|rowspan="2"| 
|-
| "Creep"
| ARIA Award for Breakthrough Artist – Single
| 
|-
| 1999
| Cash Landing
| ARIA Award for Best Adult Contemporary Album
| 
| 
|-

References

Australian parodists
Parody musicians
Australian jazz saxophonists
Male saxophonists
1959 births
Australian singer-songwriters
Living people
Swing music
Singers from Sydney
21st-century saxophonists
21st-century Australian male musicians
21st-century Australian musicians
Male jazz musicians
Australian male singer-songwriters